Attorney General Wolcott may refer to:

Christopher Wolcott (1820–1863), Attorney General of Ohio
Josiah O. Wolcott (1877–1938), Attorney General of Delaware

See also
General Wolcott (disambiguation)